Rowse Honey Ltd is a United Kingdom honey manufacturer. Its products are stocked by major supermarket chains and other stores. They also supply Kellogg's with honey for use in breakfast cereals. Other products include lemon curd and maple syrup.

History
Tony Rowse began beekeeping in a shed in Ewelme, Oxfordshire in 1938 and it was then that he formed the Rowse Honey Company in the village in 1954, in 1971 it became a Limited company. In 1987 the company moved to larger premises in nearby Wallingford and Tony's son Richard took over the running of the business that year. In September 2006 the company was purchased for c£70 million by Wellness Foods. Valeo Foods acquired the company in March 2014.

Packaging and strength ratings
The honey is sold in hexagonal glass jars and beehive style plastic bottles with green lids. The jars display a strength rating on the following scale: Mild, Fairly Mild, Medium, Fairly Strong, Strong. 
Most recently a new snap and squeeze variety sachet has been released in the UK.

Varieties
The main varieties of everyday honey are:

 Pure & Natural Clear Honey
 Pure & Natural Set Honey
 Organic Set Honey
 Organic Clear Honey
 Fairtrade Clear Honey
 Light & Mild Honey

Monofloral honey varieties include: English Wildflower, Scottish Heather, Clover, Orange Blossom, Acacia and Manuka. Honey imported from Australia, New Zealand, Tasmania and Greece is sold.

Rowse also produce novelty honeys including:

 Honey with Cinnamon
 Chilli Fusion Honey

References

External links
 

Food manufacturers of the United Kingdom
Honey
Companies based in Oxfordshire
British companies established in 1954
Food and drink companies established in 1954